The 1987–88 Utah Jazz season was the team's 14th in the NBA. The Jazz finished third in the Midwest Division with a record of 47–35, and qualified for the playoffs for the fifth straight season. In the first round of the playoffs, they defeated the Portland Trail Blazers in four games, but then lost in seven games to the defending champion Los Angeles Lakers in the semifinals. Karl Malone was selected for the 1988 NBA All-Star Game.

Draft picks

Roster

Regular season

Season standings

Record vs. opponents

Game log

Regular season

|- align="center" bgcolor="#ffcccc"
| 1
| November 6, 19886:30 PM MST
| @ Dallas
| L 93–95
|
|
|
| Reunion Arena17,007
| 0–1
|- align="center" bgcolor="#ccffcc"
| 2
| November 7
| Sacramento
| W 121–100
|
|
|
| Salt Palace
| 1–1
|- align="center" bgcolor="#ffcccc"
| 3
| November 10
| @ L.A. Clippers
| L 88–100
|
|
|
| Los Angeles Memorial Sports Arena
| 1–2
|- align="center" bgcolor="#ccffcc"
| 4
| November 11, 19877:30 PM MST
| Dallas
| W 121–92
|
|
|
| Salt Palace12,212
| 2–2
|- align="center" bgcolor="#ccffcc"
| 5
| November 13
| Phoenix
| W 109–92
|
|
|
| Salt Palace
| 3–2
|- align="center" bgcolor="#ffcccc"
| 6
| November 14
| @ Houston
| L 93–101
|
|
|
| The Summit
| 3–3
|- align="center" bgcolor="#ccffcc"
| 7
| November 17
| Denver
| W 120–110
|
|
|
| Salt Palace
| 4–3
|- align="center" bgcolor="#ffcccc"
| 8
| November 18
| @ Phoenix
| L 80–90
|
|
|
| Arizona Veterans Memorial Coliseum
| 4–4
|- align="center" bgcolor="#ccffcc"
| 9
| November 20
| Indiana
| W 112–81
|
|
|
| Salt Palace
| 5–4
|- align="center" bgcolor="#ffcccc"
| 10
| November 21
| @ San Antonio
| L 119–120
|
|
|
| HemisFair Arena
| 5–5
|- align="center" bgcolor="#ccffcc"
| 11
| November 24
| Washington
| W 100–83
|
|
|
| Salt Palace
| 6–5
|- align="center" bgcolor="#ccffcc"
| 12
| November 27
| Houston
| W 118–96
|
|
|
| Salt Palace
| 7–5
|- align="center" bgcolor="#ffcccc"
| 13
| November 30
| Philadelphia
| L 100–106
|
|
|
| Salt Palace
| 7–6

|- align="center" bgcolor="#ffcccc"
| 14
| December 2
| Chicago
| L 101–105
|
|
|
| Salt Palace
| 7–7
|- align="center" bgcolor="#ccffcc"
| 15
| December 4
| New York
| W 104–92
|
|
|
| Salt Palace
| 8–7
|- align="center" bgcolor="#ccffcc"
| 16
| December 5
| @ Sacramento
| W 126–117
|
|
|
| ARCO Arena
| 9–7
|- align="center" bgcolor="#ffcccc"
| 17
| December 8
| @ San Antonio
| L 100–105
|
|
|
| HemisFair Arena
| 9–8
|- align="center" bgcolor="#ffcccc"
| 18
| December 10
| @ Houston
| L 93–98
|
|
|
| The Summit
| 9–9
|- align="center" bgcolor="#ccffcc"
| 19
| December 12
| Golden State
| W 127–93
|
|
|
| Salt Palace
| 10–9
|- align="center" bgcolor="#ccffcc"
| 20
| December 14
| Seattle
| W 116–95
|
|
|
| Salt Palace
| 11–9
|- align="center" bgcolor="#ffcccc"
| 21
| December 16
| @ Boston
| L 111–121
|
|
|
| Boston Garden
| 11–10
|- align="center" bgcolor="#ffcccc"
| 22
| December 18
| @ Indiana
| L 97–121
|
|
|
| Market Square Arena
| 11–11
|- align="center" bgcolor="#ffcccc"
| 23
| December 19
| @ Atlanta
| L 124–130 (OT)
|
|
|
| The Omni
| 11–12
|- align="center" bgcolor="#ffcccc"
| 24
| December 21
| @ New Jersey
| L 95–106
|
|
|
| Brendan Byrne Arena
| 11–13
|- align="center" bgcolor="#ccffcc"
| 25
| December 23
| @ Cleveland
| W 91–83
|
|
|
| Richfield Coliseum
| 12–13
|- align="center" bgcolor="#ffcccc"
| 26
| December 26, 19872:00 PM MST
| L.A. Lakers
| L 109–117
|
|
|
| Salt Palace12,212
| 12–14
|- align="center" bgcolor="#ccffcc"
| 27
| December 29
| @ Denver
| W 98–97
|
|
|
| McNichols Sports Arena
| 13–14
|- align="center" bgcolor="#ccffcc"
| 28
| December 30
| Golden State
| W 104–103
|
|
|
| Salt Palace
| 14–14

|- align="center" bgcolor="#ffcccc"
| 29
| January 2
| @ Sacramento
| L 105–107
|
|
|
| ARCO Arena
| 14–15
|- align="center" bgcolor="#ffcccc"
| 30
| January 4
| Boston
| L 99–107
|
|
|
| Salt Palace
| 14–16
|- align="center" bgcolor="#ffcccc"
| 31
| January 6
| @ Philadelphia
| L 93–116
|
|
|
| The Spectrum
| 14–17
|- align="center" bgcolor="#ccffcc"
| 32
| January 8
| @ Milwaukee
| W 111–107
|
|
|
| MECCA Arena
| 15–17
|- align="center" bgcolor="#ffcccc"
| 33
| January 9
| @ Chicago
| L 91–113
|
|
|
| Chicago Stadium
| 15–18
|- align="center" bgcolor="#ccffcc"
| 34
| January 13
| Portland
| W 116–104
|
|
|
| Salt Palace
| 16–18
|- align="center" bgcolor="#ffcccc"
| 35
| January 15
| @ Seattle
| L 105–124
|
|
|
| Seattle Center Coliseum
| 16–19
|- align="center" bgcolor="#ffcccc"
| 36
| January 20, 19887:30 PM MST
| Detroit
| L 117–120
|
|
|
| Salt Palace12,212
| 16–20
|- align="center" bgcolor="#ccffcc"
| 37
| January 22
| San Antonio
| W 119–106
|
|
|
| Salt Palace
| 17–20
|- align="center" bgcolor="#ccffcc"
| 38
| January 25
| Cleveland
| W 119–96
|
|
|
| Salt Palace
| 18–20
|- align="center" bgcolor="#ffcccc"
| 39
| January 26, 19888:30 PM MST
| @ L.A. Lakers
| L 100–111
|
|
|
| The Forum17,505
| 18–21
|- align="center" bgcolor="#ffcccc"
| 40
| January 29
| @ Golden State
| L 100–102
|
|
|
| Oakland–Alameda County Coliseum Arena
| 18–22
|- align="center" bgcolor="#ccffcc"
| 41
| January 30
| Atlanta
| W 115–109
|
|
|
| Salt Palace
| 19–22

|- align="center" bgcolor="#ccffcc"
| 42
| February 1
| Seattle
| W 105–100
|
|
|
| Salt Palace
| 20–22
|- align="center" bgcolor="#ccffcc"
| 43
| February 3
| Sacramento
| W 123–91
|
|
|
| Salt Palace
| 21–22
|- align="center" bgcolor="#ccffcc"
| 44
| February 4
| @ Portland
| W 126–123
|
|
|
| Memorial Coliseum
| 22–22
|- align="center" bgcolor="#ffcccc"
| 45
| February 9, 19886:00 PM MST
| @ Dallas
| L 93–124
|
|
|
| Reunion Arena17,007
| 22–23
|- align="center" bgcolor="#ccffcc"
| 46
| February 10, 19887:30 PM MST
| Dallas
| W 93–80
|
|
|
| Salt Palace12,444
| 23–23
|- align="center" bgcolor="#ffcccc"
| 47
| February 14
| @ Denver
| L 93–107
|
|
|
| McNichols Sports Arena
| 23–24
|- align="center" bgcolor="#ccffcc"
| 48
| February 15
| Portland
| W 112–94
|
|
|
| Salt Palace
| 24–24
|- align="center" bgcolor="#ccffcc"
| 49
| February 17
| Phoenix
| W 108–103
|
|
|
| Salt Palace
| 25–24
|- align="center" bgcolor="#ccffcc"
| 50
| February 19
| @ L.A. Clippers
| W 98–88
|
|
|
| Los Angeles Memorial Sports Arena
| 26–24
|- align="center" bgcolor="#ccffcc"
| 51
| February 20
| L.A. Clippers
| W 120–103
|
|
|
| Salt Palace
| 26–25
|- align="center" bgcolor="#ffcccc"
| 52
| February 24
| Denver
| L 120–123
|
|
|
| Salt Palace
| 27–25
|- align="center" bgcolor="#ffcccc"
| 53
| February 26, 19888:30 PM MST
| @ L.A. Lakers
| L 105–112
|
|
|
| The Forum17,505
| 27–26
|- align="center" bgcolor="#ccffcc"
| 54
| February 29
| @ Sacramento
| W 115–110
|
|
|
| ARCO Arena
| 28–26

|- align="center" bgcolor="#ccffcc"
| 55
| March 1
| Houston
| W 113–112
|
|
|
| Salt Palace
| 29–26
|- align="center" bgcolor="#ccffcc"
| 56
| March 4
| @ Seattle
| W 125–110
|
|
|
| Seattle Center Coliseum
| 30–26
|- align="center" bgcolor="#ccffcc"
| 57
| March 5
| San Antonio
| W 125–106
|
|
|
| Salt Palace
| 31–26
|- align="center" bgcolor="#ccffcc"
| 58
| March 7
| New Jersey
| W 105–81
|
|
|
| Salt Palace
| 32–26
|- align="center" bgcolor="#ffcccc"
| 59
| March 9, 19885:30 PM MST
| @ Detroit
| L 98–103
|
|
|
| Pontiac Silverdome20,623
| 32–27
|- align="center" bgcolor="#ccffcc"
| 60
| March 11
| @ Washington
| W 109–107
|
|
|
| Capital Centre
| 33–27
|- align="center" bgcolor="#ffcccc"
| 61
| March 12
| @ New York
| L 105–108
|
|
|
| Madison Square Garden
| 33–28
|- align="center" bgcolor="#ccffcc"
| 62
| March 14
| @ Denver
| W 116–115
|
|
|
| McNichols Sports Arena
| 34–28
|- align="center" bgcolor="#ccffcc"
| 63
| March 16, 19887:30 PM MST
| Dallas
| W 120–105
|
|
|
| Salt Palace12,444
| 35–28
|- align="center" bgcolor="#ccffcc"
| 64
| March 18
| Denver
| W 118–111
|
|
|
| Salt Palace
| 36–28
|- align="center" bgcolor="#ffcccc"
| 65
| March 19
| @ San Antonio
| L 110–113
|
|
|
| HemisFair Arena
| 36–29
|- align="center" bgcolor="#ccffcc"
| 66
| March 22
| Phoenix
| W 103–96
|
|
|
| Salt Palace
| 37–29
|- align="center" bgcolor="#ccffcc"
| 67
| March 24
| Sacramento
| W 117–97
|
|
|
| Salt Palace
| 38–29
|- align="center" bgcolor="#ffcccc"
| 68
| March 26
| Milwaukee
| L 105–107
|
|
|
| Salt Palace
| 38–30
|- align="center" bgcolor="#ffcccc"
| 69
| March 29, 19888:30 PM MST
| @ L.A. Lakers
| L 111–122
|
|
|
| The Forum17,505
| 38–31
|- align="center" bgcolor="#ccffcc"
| 70
| March 31
| Golden State
| W 115–92
|
|
|
| Salt Palace
| 39–31

|- align="center" bgcolor="#ccffcc"
| 71
| April 2, 19887:30 PM MST
| L.A. Lakers
| W 106–92
|
|
|
| Salt Palace12,444
| 40–31
|- align="center" bgcolor="#ffcccc"
| 72
| April 5
| @ Phoenix
| L 106–111
|
|
|
| Arizona Veterans Memorial Coliseum
| 40–32
|- align="center" bgcolor="#ffcccc"
| 73
| April 7
| @ Houston
| L 107–113
|
|
|
| The Summit
| 40–33
|- align="center" bgcolor="#ffcccc"
| 74
| April 8, 19886:30 PM MDT
| @ Dallas
| L 95–118
|
|
|
| Reunion Arena17,007
| 40–34
|- align="center" bgcolor="#ccffcc"
| 75
| April 11
| @ Golden State
| W 113–102
|
|
|
| Oakland–Alameda County Coliseum Arena
| 41–34
|- align="center" bgcolor="#ccffcc"
| 76
| April 12
| L.A. Clippers
| W 100–93
|
|
|
| Salt Palace
| 42–34
|- align="center" bgcolor="#ffcccc"
| 77
| April 14
| Portland
| L 123–128
|
|
|
| Salt Palace
| 42–35
|- align="center" bgcolor="#ccffcc"
| 78
| April 16
| San Antonio
| W 107–82
|
|
|
| Salt Palace
| 43–35
|- align="center" bgcolor="#ccffcc"
| 79
| April 19
| @ Portland
| W 129–122
|
|
|
| Memorial Coliseum
| 44–35
|- align="center" bgcolor="#ccffcc"
| 80
| April 20
| @ L.A. Clippers
| W 112–106
|
|
|
| Los Angeles Memorial Sports Arena
| 45–35
|- align="center" bgcolor="#ccffcc"
| 81
| April 22
| @ Seattle
| W 110–109
|
|
|
| Seattle Center Coliseum
| 46–35
|- align="center" bgcolor="#ccffcc"
| 82
| April 23
| Houston
| W 125–107
|
|
|
| Salt Palace
| 47–35

Playoffs

|- align="center" bgcolor="#ffcccc"
| 1
| April 28
| @ Portland
| L 96–108
| Thurl Bailey (31)
| Karl Malone (13)
| John Stockton (9)
| Memorial Coliseum12,666
| 0–1
|- align="center" bgcolor="#ccffcc"
| 2
| April 30
| @ Portland
| W 114–105
| Karl Malone (37)
| Karl Malone (16)
| John Stockton (13)
| Memorial Coliseum12,666
| 1–1
|- align="center" bgcolor="#ccffcc"
| 3
| May 4
| Portland
| W 113–108
| Karl Malone (35)
| Karl Malone (9)
| John Stockton (16)
| Salt Palace12,444
| 2–1
|- align="center" bgcolor="#ccffcc"
| 4
| May 6
| Portland
| W 111–96
| Karl Malone (38)
| Mark Eaton (11)
| John Stockton (10)
| Salt Palace12,444
| 3–1
|-

|- align="center" bgcolor="#ffcccc"
| 1
| May 8, 19881:30 PM MDT
| @ L.A. Lakers
| L 91–110
| Karl Malone (29)
| Thurl Bailey (8)
| John Stockton (16)
| The Forum17,505
| 0–1
|- align="center" bgcolor="#ccffcc"
| 2
| May 10, 19889:00 PM MDT
| @ L.A. Lakers
| W 101–97
| Karl Malone (29)
| Mark Eaton (12)
| John Stockton (13)
| The Forum17,505
| 1–1
|- align="center" bgcolor="#ccffcc"
| 3
| May 13, 19889:00 PM MDT
| L.A. Lakers
| W 96–89
| Karl Malone (29)
| Mark Eaton (14)
| John Stockton (12)
| Salt Palace12,444
| 2–1
|- align="center" bgcolor="#ffcccc"
| 4
| May 15, 19881:30 PM MDT
| L.A. Lakers
| L 100–113
| Karl Malone (29)
| Karl Malone (11)
| John Stockton (13)
| Salt Palace12,444
| 2–2
|- align="center" bgcolor="#ffcccc"
| 5
| May 17, 19888:30 PM MDT
| @ L.A. Lakers
| L 109–111
| Thurl Bailey (28)
| Karl Malone (16)
| John Stockton (24)
| The Forum17,505
| 2–3
|- align="center" bgcolor="#ccffcc"
| 6
| May 19, 19888:30 PM MDT
| L.A. Lakers
| W 108–80
| Karl Malone (27)
| Karl Malone (11)
| John Stockton (17)
| Salt Palace12,444
| 3–3
|- align="center" bgcolor="#ffcccc"
| 7
| May 21, 19881:30 PM MDT
| @ L.A. Lakers
| L 98–109
| Karl Malone (31)
| Karl Malone (15)
| John Stockton (20)
| The Forum17,505
| 3–4
|-

Player statistics

Season

Playoffs

Awards and records
Karl Malone, All-NBA Second Team
John Stockton, All-NBA Second Team
Mark Eaton, NBA All-Defensive Second Team
Karl Malone, NBA All-Defensive Second Team

Transactions

References

Utah Jazz seasons
Utah
Utah Jazz
Utah Jazz